Portsmouth F.C. XI and Academy consist of the reserve and academy footballers of Portsmouth F.C.

Portsmouth XI 
Previously called Portsmouth Reserves, the Portsmouth XI consist of mainly young players under the age of 23 who are no longer eligible for the academy but are still trying to make the step up to the senior team. This team is used to give younger professional players and first team players returning from injury the chance to play and keep or build up match fitness, or for trialists at the club to impress in a match environment.

The club are currently opting out of fielding a competitive, league-based reserve team. Instead, young players are being sent out on loan to local non-league football clubs for first-team action and a number of friendly matches are arranged over the course of the season for players to play in. Players are able to freely move between the first team, XI or academy (depending on age and contract status).

Development Team

The Academy 
Portsmouth were granted academy status at the beginning of the 2007/2008 season. In their first year as an academy side, they finished a highly respectable 4th-place finish in the Premier League Academy Group A, beating some well established academy sides such as those of Southampton and Crystal Palace. In the 2012-13 season the Academy won the Football League Youth Alliance South East Conference.

The academy currently operates at Category Three level. Academy players can be promoted into the XI or first team, but due to EPPP rules, will still remain on youth contracts until a professional contract is offered. They play in the Football League Youth Alliance South-West Division and also compete in the FA Youth Cup.

Currently, Alex Bass and Haji Mnoga are notable academy graduates in the first team squad.

Academy team

Academy graduates (2009–present)
Academy graduates who still play for Portsmouth, including those that are currently out on loan to other clubs, are highlighted in green.

Information in the above table is current as of December 2020

Other notable academy graduates 

 England
 Darren Anderton
 Gary O'Neil
 Shaun Cooper
 Lewis Buxton
 James Keene
 Paris Cowan-Hall
 Rowan Vine
 Alan Knight
 Aaron Flahavan
 Sammy Igoe
 Wales
 Kit Symons
 Republic of Ireland
 Marc Wilson
 Bosnia and Herzegovina
 Asmir Begović
 Guernsey
 Chris Tardif
 Jamaica
 Deon Burton
 Darryl Powell

References

Reserves
Football academies in England